was a German passenger ship of the Hamburg-America Line (HAPAG) of some . She is credited with having been the first purpose-built cruise ship.    Launched on 29 June 1900, she served with HAPAG until 16 December 1906 after being accidentally grounded off Jamaica.

History
In 1886, Albert Ballin joined HAPAG as manager of its passage department. Thirteen years later, in 1899, he became managing director. It was during this term that he realized his company's largest and flagship vessel, lay largely unused during the winter season. Due to inclement weather, travelers largely stayed away from the North Atlantic route. It was then that Ballin, despite criticism from his fellow directors at HAPAG and other steamship companies, planned to send Augusta Victoria on a 58-day “pleasure voyage” from Cuxhaven, Germany to the Mediterranean and Orient. This extended cruise would include well-planned excursions ashore to ports-of-call along the route and Ballin would be a passenger himself. The voyage was a success, and similar ones were planned. 

Despite their increasing success, these early cruises, called "excursions", were difficult to plan with existing ships. Constructed as ocean liners, they did not meet the requirements of the pleasure-seeking market. They offered few amenities aboard. This became apparent during long stretches at sea. Furthermore, their construction as multi-class vessels also proved a hindrance as such vessels provided restricted access to deck space. Whatever deck space there was, was mostly sheltered, and designed to accommodate the rigors of the North Atlantic instead of the seas of more southern climes. Ballin believed that only a vessel specifically designed for cruising would be appropriate. Furthermore, such a vessel could spend the entire year doing so.

A few months after Ballin became managing director, he commissioned – in 1900 – Blohm & Voss to construct such a ship, to be named after Kaiser Wilhelm II's daughter. The ship was launched on 29 June 1900 and christened Prinzessin Victoria Luise.

A revolutionary ship
With cruises targeted toward wealthy travelers, Prinzessin Victoria Luise was designed to look more like a private yacht than any of her commercial counterparts. She was painted all white and had two masts (one fore and aft) and two tall, slim funnels amidships. She had a rounded stern and a richly decorated clipper bow, with bowsprit, ending in a figurehead of the German princess.

On board, she also did not look like other commercial vessels of the time. She contained 120 cabins, all first class. All staterooms were luxuriously appointed. Reportedly, Ballin instituted some interior modifications recommended by the emperor. There was also a library, a gymnasium, and a darkroom for the development of film by amateur photographers. Pushing all this at a steady  were quadruple expansion steam engines. After fitting out, the kaiser formally inspected the vessel and was unhappy that it was slightly longer than the royal yacht .

Short career

Prinzessin Victoria Luise left on her maiden voyage on 5 January 1901 from Hamburg, stopping at Boulogne, Plymouth, and finally reaching New York on 17 January. She would depart New York on 26 January to the West Indies for her first cruise. Her second cruise, to the Mediterranean and the Black Sea, commenced from New York on 9 March. Other cruises would take the ship to the Baltic. She would be used almost exclusively for cruising, as she had limited cargo or mail capacity. Yet, she would be diverted from cruising on six occasions to make complete transatlantic crossings. 

Almost five years after her debut, her career came to an end while on a West Indian cruise. On the night of 16 December, the ship had tried to enter the harbor of Kingston, but later her commander Captain Brunswig decided to anchor at Port Royal when he mistook the lighthouse at Plumb Point for that at the westernmost point of Port Royal. In an attempt to dislodge the ship, the engines were put full astern to no avail.

Although the passengers were rescued without loss the following morning, Captain Brunswig retreated to his cabin and committed suicide with a gunshot to the head. A German admiralty court found the captain negligent in May of the following year.

Salvage operations commenced immediately after the grounding. The German cruiser  and the French training ship Duguay-Trouin came to the aid of the stranded ship, with Bremen attempting to tow the steamer off the rocks. Within days, continued buffeting by waves and a storm pushed the ship broadside of the shore with a sharp list to port. Inspection revealed major structural damage to her frame and keel plates. She was declared a total loss on 19 December, and sank in a seaquake in 1907.

References

External links

Ships built in Hamburg
1900 ships
Cruise ships of Germany
Steamships
Ships of the Hamburg America Line
Maritime incidents in 1906
Shipwrecks in the Caribbean Sea